Absolon Stumme (died 1499) was a Late Gothic painter from Northern Germany who worked in Hamburg.

Absolon Stumme married into the  family of artists, becoming the second stepfather of Hinrik Bornemann, who died the same year as he did. After their deaths the Hamburg Cathedral altarpiece, upon which they had been working, was finished by Wilm Dedeke. It is debated by 20th-century art historians which of the two is recorded as the Master of the Hamburg cathedral altar. Both are also associated with the Master of the Lüneburg foot washing.

References 

Goldgrund und Himmelslicht. Mittelalter in Hamburg. Exhibit catalog from the Hamburger Kunsthalle, Hamburg 1999.

External links 

 
 Entry for Absolon Stumme on the Union List of Artist Names
 Work by Absolon Stumme in the St. Annen Museum

1510 deaths
Year of birth unknown
15th-century German painters
16th-century German painters
Gothic painters
German male painters
German people of Danish descent
Painters from Hamburg